Marc R. Nikkel (1950–2000) was an American Episcopal priest, artist, author, teacher, missionary to the Sudan, and advocate for the Dinka ("Jieng") people of South Sudan.

Biography
Marc Nikkel was born to Mennonite parents in Reedley, California, and studied at the California State University School for the Visual Arts and at Fuller Theological Seminary before becoming an Anglican.

In 1981, Nikkel began teaching at Bishop Gwynne College in Mundri, Sudan.  From 1984–1985, he studied at the General Theological Seminary of the Episcopal Church in Chelsea, New York, being ordained to the diaconate by the Bishop of Southwestern Virginia and to the priesthood on his return to the Sudan.

Nikkel was kidnapped by the Sudanese Liberation Army in July 1987 along with several other Americans. He was later released in northern Kenya. From 1987–1988, he taught at Saint Paul's United Theological College in Limuru, Kenya. He then left Africa to begin doctoral studies at the Centre for the Study of Christianity in the Non-Western World in Edinburgh, Scotland.

After completing his doctoral work, Nikkel served as an advisor to several Sudanese Anglican dioceses, working in partnership with the Church Missionary Society of England and the Episcopal Church in the U.S.A. His primary work was in theological education among the Dinka people of the Nile basin in South Sudan.

In Kenya, Marc Nikkel also co-founded Kakuma Refugee Camp with Bishop Nathanael Garang of Bor Diocese, South Sudan.  There at Kakuma, Marc Nikkel named the young Dinka survivors "the Lost Boys."

Marc Nikkel was diagnosed with cancer in 1998, and died in California in 2000.

Selected bibliography
 The Outcast, the Stranger and the Enemy in Dinka Tradition contrasted with Attitudes of Contemporary Dinka Christians (unpublished Master's thesis, General Theological Seminary, 1988)
 Dinka Christianity: The Origins and Development of Christianity among the Dinka of Sudan, with Special Reference to the Songs of Dinka Christians
 Why Haven't You Left? Letters from the Sudan, edited by Grant LeMarquand

External links
Entry from the Dictionary of African Christian Biography
The Crosses of Dinka Christians from Fox Video Production and Post, P.O.B. 681027, Franklin, TN  37068, USA. 
Editorial reflection on Marc Nikkel from Anglicans Online

American Anglican missionaries
1950 births
2000 deaths
Converts to Anglicanism from Mennonitism
California State University alumni
Missionary educators
Anglican missionaries in Sudan
Anglican missionaries in Kenya
American expatriates in Sudan
American expatriates in Kenya
Kidnapped American people
Kidnappings in Sudan
1987 crimes in Sudan
20th-century American Episcopalians
Deaths from cancer in California